The Best of Chet Atkins, Vol. 2 is a compilation recording by American guitarist Chet Atkins.

This title has been discontinued. All the songs are available on other compilation packages and Chet Atkins retrospectives.

Track listing
 "Yakety Axe" (Boots Randolph, James Rich) – 2:00
 "Limelight – 3:08  
 "Josephine" (Burke Bivens, Gus Kahn, Wayne King) – 2:03  
 "Alley Cat (Bent Fabricius-Bjerre) – 2:17  
 "Que Sera, Sera (Whatever Will Be, Will Be)" (Livingston, Evans) – 2:14  
 "White Silver Sands" (Charles "Red" Matthews) – 2:14  
 "Oh Lonesome Me" (Don Gibson) – 2:17  
 "Never on Sunday" (Manos Hadjidakis, Billy Towne) – 3:02  
 "Give the World a Smile" (Otis Deaton, M. L. Yandell) – 2:04  
 "Freight Train" (James, Williams) – 2:00  
 "Wheels" (Norman Petty) – 2:28

Personnel
Chet Atkins – guitar

1966 greatest hits albums
Chet Atkins compilation albums
RCA Victor compilation albums